The Fashion is the self-titled second album by Danish indie rock band The Fashion. It was originally released digitally in early 2007, and was followed by a  physical release in Europe on January 8, 2008 by RCA Victor, and a North American release by Epic Records on May 13, 2008.

Track listing
 Dead Boys 	- 2:34
 Solo Impala (Take the Money and Run) 	- 3:07
 Untitled  	- 3:35
 Letters from the Ambulance 	- 4:02
 The Funeral Dept. 	- 3:47
 Like Knives 	- 4:14
 Alabaster 	- 2:45
 Mathematics 	- 3:14
 Apt. 	- 3:24
 Vampires with Gold Teeth 	- 4:01

Videos
Solo Impala (Take The Money and Run) - (2008) (official video on YouTube)
Like Knives - (2009) (official video on YouTube)
Letters from the Ambulance - (2007) (Official video on Dailymotion)
Dead Boys - (2009) (Official video on YouTube)

Charts

References

2008 albums
RCA Records albums